Acrolepia oxyglypta is a moth of the  family Acrolepiidae. It was described by Edward Meyrick in 1929. It is found in Panama.

References

Moths described in 1929
Acrolepiidae